Nathan Godfrey (born 13 September 1977) is an entrepreneur and sports manager best known as the former CEO of the Canterbury Rugby Union in New Zealand. He is also a member of the 7 Continents Club and Founder of Run Kangaroo Island bronze medal winner at the South Australian Tourism Awards in 2021.

Education 
Godfrey was educated at the University of Otago where he studied bachelor degrees in Commerce and Education. In 2018, he graduated with an MBA from the Australian Institute of Business.

Career 

Godfrey’s sports management career began in 2010 as an AFLPA accredited sports agent, before joining the Adelaide Crows in 2012 where he worked for 3 years. In early 2015, Godfrey relocated to New Zealand to take up a role as Head of Commercial at the Wellington Phoenix working closely with Football Federation Australia to renew the A-League license and secure notable global partnerships.

In December 2016, Godfrey was appointed Chief Executive Officer of the Canterbury Rugby Union following in the footsteps of All Blacks CEO Steve Tew and Crusaders CEO Hamish Riach.

Godfrey was an advocate for diversity and inclusion across all levels of the game and was instrumental in leading a high profile anti-discrimination campaign endorsed by the Human Rights Commission. He was also vocal in supporting the Ardern Government's vision to fund a new multi-purpose Arena in Christchurch to replace the earthquake damaged stadium.  

Godfrey made a controversial decision to snub the Crusaders and Canterbury Men’s Rugby Teams who had both won their respective competitions, instead choosing to nominate the Canterbury Women’s Rugby Team for their inaugural Championship success in 2017. The CRFU Women's team went on to be named ‘Team of the Year’ at the 2018 Sports Awards and subsequently won four NZ National Championship titles in a row.

In late 2018, Godfrey announced he was stepping down as CEO to return home to Australia with his wife and young family. Godfrey accepted a senior role as Director Programs & Operations at the NSW Government Office of Sport. He also sat on the National Board at the Duke of Edinburgh International Award, a youth leadership program established in 1956 and delivered in 144 countries.

References 

Living people
Sports managers
University of Otago alumni

1977 births